Sardar Ravi Inder Singh Dummna (born 23 March 1940) is an industrialist, former Speaker of the Punjab Vidhan Sabha and a five time M.L.A. from Morinda. He is an engineering graduate from I.I.T. Kharagpur & an M.B.A. from Harvard University.

He is the grandson of Sardar Indra Singh ‒ the steel magnate and the son of Sardar Ajaib Singh. Singh is the nephew of Sardar Baldev Singh ‒ the first Defence Minister of Independent India. Sardar Baldev Singh was a close confidant of Nehru and is still widely known as the wealthiest Sikh man.

References

1940 births
People from Rupnagar district
Living people
Indian industrialists
Harvard Business School alumni
Punjab, India politicians
Speakers of the Punjab Legislative Assembly
Indian expatriates in the United States
Shiromani Akali Dal politicians